This is a list of the counts, dukes, grand dukes, and prime ministers of Oldenburg.

Counts of Oldenburg

 1088/1101–1108 Elimar I
 1108–1143 Elimar II
 1143–1168 Christian I the Quarrelsome
 1168–1211 Maurice I
 1209–1251 Otto I, joint rule with Christian II and later with John I
 1211–1233 Christian II
 1233–1272 John I
 1272–1278 Christian III
 1272–1301 Otto II, Count of Oldenburg-Delmenhorst
 1278–1305 John II
 1302–1323 Christian IV
 1305–1345 John III
 1331–1356 John IV
 1345–1368 Conrad I
 1368–1386 Conrad II
 1386–1420 Maurice II
 1368–1398 Christian V
 1398–1423 Christian VI
 1423–1440 Dietrich the Lucky
 1440–1448 Christian VII
 1448–1483 Gerhard VI "the Quarrelsome"
 1483–1500 Adolph, Count of Oldenburg-Delmenhorst
 1500–1526 John V
 1526–1529 John VI, joint rule with his brothers George, Christopher and Anthony I, forced to resign in 1529
 1526–1529 George, joint rule with his brothers John VI, Christopher and Anthony I, forced to resign in 1529
 1526–1566 Christopher, joint rule with his brothers John VI, George and Anthony I
 1526–1573 Anthony I, joint rule with his brothers John VI, George and Christopher
 1573–1603 John VII
 1573–1619 Anthony II, Count of Oldenburg-Delmenhorst
 1603–1667 Anthony Günther
 1667–1670 Frederick I, in personal union as Frederick III King of Denmark-Norway
 1670–1699 Christian VIII, in personal union as Christian V King of Denmark-Norway
 1699–1730 Frederick II, in personal union as Frederick IV King of Denmark-Norway
 1730–1746 Christian IX, in personal union as Christian VI King of Denmark-Norway
 1746–1766 Frederick III, in personal union as Frederick V King of Denmark-Norway
 1766–1773 Christian X, in personal union as Christian VII King of Denmark-Norway, ceded the county to the Holstein-Gottorp line
 1773 Paul I, ceded the county to his cousin of the Holstein-Gottorp line
 1773–1774 Frederick Augustus I (elevated to Duke in 1774), in personal union Prince-Bishop of Lübeck

Dukes of Oldenburg

| Frederick Augustus I1774–6 July 1785
|  
| 20 September 1711Gottorp, Schleswigson of Christian August of Holstein-Gottorp and Albertina Frederica
| Ulrike Friederike Wilhelmine of Hesse-KasselKassel21 November 1752 three children 
| 6 July 1785Oldenburgaged 73 
|-
| William, Duke of Oldenburg1785–1810
|  
|  3 January 1754Eutinson of Frederick August I and Ulrike 
| Never married
| 2 July 1823Schloss Plönaged 69 
|}

To France in 1810–1813

| William, Duke of Oldenburg1813–2 July 1823 
|  
|  3 January 1754Eutinson of Frederick Augustus I and Ulrike 
| Never married
| 2 July 1823Schloss Plönaged 69 
|-

Grand Dukes of Oldenburg

|Peter I1823–21 May 1829
|  
| 17 January 1755Rastedenephew of Frederick Augustus I and cousin of William
| Frederica of Württemberg 6 June 1781two children 
| 21 May 1829Oldenburgaged 74
|-
| Augustus I1829–27 February 1853
|  
| 13 July 1783Rastedeson of Peter I and Friederike 
| Adelheid of Anhalt-Bernburg-Schaumburg-Hoym24 July 1817two children Ida of Anhalt-Bernburg-Schaumburg-Hoym24 June 1825one childCecilia of Sweden  5 May 1831three children 
| 27 February 1853Oldenburgaged 69
|-
| Peter II1853–13 June 1900
|  
| 8 July 1827Oldenburgson of Augustus I and Ida
| Elisabeth of Saxe-Altenburg 10 February 1852two children 
| 13 June 1900Rastedeaged 72
|-
| Frederick Augustus II  1900–11 November 1918
|  
| 16 November 1852Oldenburgson of Peter II and Elisabeth 
| Elisabeth Anna of Prussia 18 February 1878two children Elisabeth of Mecklenburg-Schwerin 24 October 1896 5 children
| 24 February 1931Rastedeaged 78
|}

Full style
Grand Duke of Oldenburg, Heir in Norway, Duke of Schleswig, Holstein, Stormarn, Ditmarshes & Oldenburg, Prince of Lübeck and Birkenfeld, Lord of Jever and Kniphausen

Heads of the Grand Ducal Family of Oldenburg since 1918 (not ruling)

 Frederick Augustus II, former Grand Duke, Head of House 1900-1931 (1852-1931)
  Nikolaus, Duke 1931-1970 (1897-1970)
 Anton Günther, Duke 1970-2014 (1923-2014)
  Christian, Duke 2014–present (born 1955)
 Duke Alexander, heir apparent (born 1990)
 Duke Philipp (born 1991)
  Duke Anton Friedrich (born 1993)
 Duke Peter (1926-2016)
 Duke Friedrich August (born 1952)
 Duke Nikolaus (born 1955)
 Duke Christoph (born 1985)
 Duke Georg (born 1990)
  Duke Oscar (born 1991)
  Duke Georg Moritz (born 1957)
 Duke Friedrich August (1936–2017)
  Duke Paul-Wladimir (born 1969)
 Duke Kirill (born 2002)
 Duke Carlos (born 2004)
  Duke Paul (born 2005)
 Duke Huno (born 1940)
  Duke Johann (born 1940)
  Duke Konstantin Nikolaus (born 1975)

Prime ministers of the Republic of Oldenburg

 1918–1919 Bernhard Kuhnt (USPD)
 1919–1923 Theodor Tantzen (DDP)
 1923–1930 Eugen von Finckh (no party)
 1930–1932 Friedrich Cassebohm
 1932–1933 Carl Röver (NSDAP)
 1933–1945 Georg Joel (NSDAP)
 1945–1946 Theodor Tantzen (FDP)
''To Lower Saxony in 1946

See also
 List of consorts of Oldenburg

References

External links
 The House of Oldenburg

Oldenburg
 
 
 
Oldenburg
Oldenburg (state)
Lists of German nobility